Awki awki (Aymara awki father / gentleman, the reduplication signifies that there is a group of something) is a folk dance performed in the La Paz Department of Bolivia and in the Huancané Province of Peru. The dance satirizes the Spanish conquerors of the colonial period.

See also 
 P'aquchi

References 

Bolivian dances
Peruvian dances
Native American dances
La Paz Department (Bolivia)
Puno Region
Indigenous culture of the Andes